Thomas Shepard may refer to:
Thomas Shepard (minister) (1605–1649), American Puritan minister
Thomas D. Shepard (1925–2012), American politician, Los Angeles City Council member
Thomas Z. Shepard (born 1936), American record producer
Tommy Shepard (1923–1993), American trombonist

See also
Thomas Sheppard (disambiguation)
Thomas Shepherd (disambiguation)